The Rejection Show is a comedic based variety show that features the rejected and turned down material of professional and amateur writers, comedians, cartoonists, artists, and human beings who display their creative "failures" live on stage.

The Rejection Show was created by comedian and writer Jon Friedman (producer, host) in the summer of 2003 after a string of his own personal and creative rejections left him wanting to create a forum for such works that other people deemed "not good enough." The show features material that is both good and bad and maintains its strength in the deep variety nature of the show, from stories of personal heartbreak to rejected sketches from Saturday Night Live to rejected cartoons from The New Yorker.

The Rejection Show is set to be a major book release published by Villard, titled Rejected: Tales of the Failed, Dumped and Cancelled.

The Rejection Show has been featured in the Los Angeles Times, Newsday, The New York Times, The Daily News, the New York Post, The New Yorker, The Onion, ABC News, CBS News Sunday Morning, NPR, XM Satellite Radio, and in international papers around the globe.

External links
 http://www.rejectionshow.com/
 http://www.tremendousrabbit.com/
 Interview with Jon Friedman at WickedInfo.com

American comedy television series